Seagull Screaming Kiss Her Kiss Her is a Japanese band formed by guitarist Aiha Higurashi in 1992. Beginning as a two-girl band in New York City with her friend Sachiko Ito, it was not until after they had played a few shows that the band got its name, which was lifted from the 1984 XTC song. Aiha returned to Tokyo solo in 1994 where she enlisted bassist and vocalist Nao Koyama and drummer Takaharu "Takape" Karashima. Karashima left the band after recording Pretty In Pink in 1999.

Discography
Studio albums
 Give Them Back to Me (1996)
 It's Brand New (1997)
 17 (1998)
 No! No! No! (2000)
 No! No! No Star 2000 (2000)
 Future or No Future (2001)
 Eternal Adolescence (2015)

References

External links
 
 Album page on Arrivederci Baby
 Rock of Japan - SSKHKH
 Jrawk Aiha Higurashi interview, Feb. 2009
 Louder Than War - Seagull Screaming Kiss Her Kiss Her, A Retrospective, July 2013

Japanese indie rock groups
Japanese alternative rock groups
Musical groups from Tokyo
Musical groups from New York City